The Lycée Henri-IV is a public secondary school located in Paris. Along with the Lycée Louis-le-Grand, it is widely regarded as one of the most prestigious and demanding sixth-form colleges (lycées) in France.

The school educates more than 2,500 students from collège (the first four years of secondary education in France) to classes préparatoires (preparatory classes to prepare students for entry to the elite grandes écoles such as École normale supérieure, École polytechnique, Centrale Paris, Mines ParisTech, ISAE-SUPAERO, HEC Paris, ESSEC Business School, and ESCP Europe, among others).

Its motto is "Domus Omnibus Una" ("A Home For All").



Buildings and history 

Lycée Henri-IV is located in the former royal Abbey of St Genevieve, in the heart of the Latin Quarter on the left bank of the river Seine, near the Panthéon, the church Saint-Étienne-du-Mont, and the rue Mouffetard. Rich in history, architecture and culture, the Latin Quarter contains France's oldest and the most prestigious educational establishments: the École Normale Supérieure, the Sorbonne, the Collège de France, the Lycée Saint-Louis and the Lycée Louis-le-Grand.

The abbey was first established in 506; it flourished as a consequence of royal patronage, becoming an integral part of the Sorbonne and housing a great library. The abbey was suppressed during the French Revolution, and in October 1796 the site became the first of many public schools in France. The lycée's name has changed several times since its inception–École Centrale du Panthéon (1794–1804); Lycée Napoléon (1804–1815); Collège Henri IV (1815–1848); Lycée Napoléon (1848–1870) and Lycée Corneille (1870–1872)–before its current name was settled on in 1873.

Today Henri-IV retains many features of the former abbey. The former abbey's library, which had the third-largest collection of books in Europe (transferred to the nearby Bibliothèque Sainte-Geneviève during the 19th century), is composed of four aisles forming a cross with a cupola in the intersection. It is one of the main features of the Lycée with its 18th-century boiseries and pavement as well as a cupola frescoed and carved by the painter Jean II Restout in the 1730s. Two aisles of the library are now used as libraries for Lycée and Classes Préparatoires levels and the two other aisles are used as rooms for conferences and exams. Another highlight is the Salle des médailles (Room of the medals), a long gallery once used as a cabinet of curiosities (a room used to display natural curiosities and artworks). It has richly decorated and carved baroque boiseries and mirrors dating back to the 18th century. The lycée's chapel dates back to the Middle Ages as does the cloister and the Clovis tower, perhaps the lycée's most famous feature. The Salle des Actes displays medieval effigies of the abbey's monks, discovered during restoration in the 1990s. The main staircase, named the escalier de la Vierge (Virgin Mary's staircase), which has a 17th-century statue of the Virgin Mary as its centrepiece, is another striking feature.

Notable alumni

 Eugène Albertini, epigrapher
 Dov Alfon, journalist, writer, editor-in-chief and head of editorial strategy of the French newspaper Libération
 Victor Baltard, architect
 Delphine Batho, politician
 Jean Baudrillard, sociologist
 Guy Béart, singer
 Ferdinand de Lesseps, Diplomat and entrepreneur responsible for the Suez Canal
 Marcellin Berthelot, chemist
 Léon Blum, French prime minister (during the Popular Front government)
 Jean-Louis Bory, novelist and film critic
 Jacques de Bourbon Busset, co-founder of CERN, member of the Académie française
 Patrick Bruel, French singer-writer (who refers to the lycée in his song "Place des grands hommes")
 Isambard Kingdom Brunel, British engineer
 René Capitant, lawyer and politician
 Augustin-Louis Cauchy, mathematician, engineer, and physicist
 Camille Dalmais, singer
 Gilles Deleuze, philosopher
 Claire Dorland-Clauzel, Michelin's head of communications 
 Arthur Dreyfus, journalist and writer
 Esther Duflo, economist, professor at the MIT, recipient of the John Bates Clark Medal in 2010, Nobel Memorial Prize in Economic Sciences, 2019. 
 Léon-Paul Fargue, poet
 Valentin Feldman, philosopher and member of the French resistance
 Michel Foucault, philosopher
 Paul Fournel, writer and bicyclist
 Georges Friedmann, sociologist
 André Gide, writer, Nobel Prize in Literature 1947. 
 Julien Gracq, writer
 Georges-Eugène Haussmann, baron, préfet, and city planner
 Alfred Jarry, writer, best known for Ubu Roi
 Emmanuel Le Roy Ladurie, historian, best known for Montaillou
 Claude Lefort, philosopher and political activist
 Pierre Loti, sailor and writer
 Emmanuel Macron, French President
 Jacques Maritain, philosopher
 Carlo Marochetti, sculptor
 Jean Malaurie, anthropologist, biologist and writer
 Guy de Maupassant, writer
 Prosper Mérimée, writer (of Carmen, for example)
 Christopher Meyer, British ambassador to the United States
 Marius Moutet, diplomat
 Alfred de Musset, playwright and poet
 Paul Nizan, philosopher and writer
 Henri d'Orléans, Count of Paris, pretender to the French throne
 Jean d'Ormesson, novelist, fellow of the Académie française
 Mazarine Pingeot, novelist and journalist, daughter of French president François Mitterrand
 Plantu, cartoonist for Le Monde
 Henri Pourrat, writer and anthropologist
 Pierre Puvis de Chavannes, painter
 Didier Ratsiraka, former President of Madagascar
 Pierre Restany, art critic and cultural philosopher
 Éric Rohmer, New Wave director, writer and actor
 Michel Sapin, Deputy Minister of Justice from May 1991 to April 1992, Finance Minister from April 1992 to March 1993, and Minister of Civil Servants and State Reforms from March 2000 to May 2002. Current Finance Minister.
 Jean-Paul Sartre, philosopher, Nobel Prize in Literature 1964. 
 Georges Saupique, sculptor and creator of the school's war memorial
 Maurice Schumann, fellow of the Académie française, minister, and senator
 Jorge Semprún, Spanish Minister for culture
 Bertrand Tavernier, actor, director, producer
 Albert Thibaudet, essayist and critic
 Fabrice Tourre, Goldman Sachs trader
 Pierre Vidal-Naquet, historian
 Alfred de Vigny, poet
 André Vingt-Trois, Cardinal, current Archbishop of Paris
 Simone Weil, philosopher
 Laurent Wauquiez, former French Minister of Higher Education and Research
 Jean Yoyotte, Egyptologist
 Stella Jang, Korean singer-songwriter

Notable teachers

 Henri Bergson, philosopher
 Étienne Borne, philosopher
 Jean-Louis Bory, novelist and film critic
 Émile Auguste Chartier, philosopher
 Georges Cuvier, naturalist and zoologist
 Georges Pompidou, French president

See also

 Secondary education in France
 Education in France

Notes and references
Notes

Sources

Bibliography
 Sophie Peltier-Le Dinh, Danielle Michel-Chich & André Arnold-Peltier,  Le Lycée Henri-IV, entre potaches et moines copistes, PIPPA;

External links

  Official website
  Association des anciens élèves
  Association historique des élèves du lycée Henri IV
  Site de la classe préparatoire à l'Ecole des chartes du lycée
  Lycée Henri IV | Multimedia

 
Buildings and structures in the 5th arrondissement of Paris